Arnold Brown and Company was a short-lived radio program that was broadcast from October 1989 to August 1990.  There were 12 half-hour episodes and it was broadcast on BBC Radio 4.  It starred Arnold Brown, Chris Campbell, David Charles, Emma Clarke and Judy Hawkins.

Notes and references
Lavalie, John. Arnold Brown and Company. EpGuides. 21 Jul 2005. 29 Jul 2005  <https://web.archive.org/web/20070814152531/http://www.epguides.com/ArnoldBrownandCompany/%3E.

BBC Radio 4 programmes